Nokia is a Finnish telecommunications corporation.

Nokia may also refer to:

Companies
 Nokia Networks, a subsidiary of Nokia Corporation
 Nokian Tyres, a Finnish manufacturer of tyres split from Nokia Corporation in 1988
 Nokian Footwear, a Finnish manufacturer of footwear split from Nokia Corporation in 1990
 Microsoft Mobile, Microsoft smartphone subsidiary created from Nokia's mobile phone division that once handled "Nokia" and "Nokia Lumia"-branded phones
 HMD Global, cellphone company that handles "Nokia" and "Nokia Mobile" branded phones

Places
 Nokia, Finland, a Finnish town
 Nokia railway station, a railway station in Nokia town

People
 noki-A (born 1973), Japanese professional wrestler
 Princess Nokia (born 1992), American rapper

Other uses
 Nokia tune, a popular mobile ringtone
 Nokia (yacht), a yacht

See also
 Nokia Revival, a Christian movement
 Nokianvirta, a river in Finland